State Road 150 (NM 150) is a  state highway in the US state of New Mexico. NM 150's southern terminus is at U.S. Route 64 (US 64) and NM 522 at what is locally referred to as the “old blinking light,” and the northern terminus is at the end of state maintenance at Taos Ski Valley.

The highway travels through El Prado and Arroyo Seco before reaching Carson National Forest as it winds up to Taos Ski Valley, following the Rio Hondo. Three national forest campgrounds and four trailheads are located along it.

Due to the number of driveways on the southern end of the roadway between El Prado and Arroyo Seco, residents in 2016 successfully lobbied for the speed limit to be lowered to 45 from 55.

A non-motorized trail along the eastern right-of-way is proposed for the same stretch.

Major intersections

See also

References

150
Transportation in Taos County, New Mexico